Soroush Eskandari Vatannejad (born 6 June 1989) is an Iranian male badminton player. In 2014, he won the men's doubles title at the Kenya International tournament partnered with Hasan Motaghi. In 2015, he became the men's singles champion at the Zambia International tournament. He also won the men's doubles title at the South Africa International tournament partnered with Farzin Khanjani.

Achievements

BWF International Challenge/Series (3 titles)
Men's Singles

Men's Doubles

 BWF International Challenge tournament
 BWF International Series tournament
 BWF Future Series tournament

References

External links
 

1989 births
Living people
Iranian male badminton players
Badminton players at the 2014 Asian Games
Asian Games competitors for Iran